The Hannelore Greve Literature Prize honors outstanding achievements in the field of German-language literature. The Hamburg Authors' Association has been awarding the Hannelore Greve Literature Prize every two years since 2004, alternating annually with the Walter Kempowski Literature Prize. The award, endowed with 25,000 euros, was donated by Hamburg's honorary citizens Hannelore and Helmut Greve.

Recipients 
Source:

 2004 Siegfried Lenz
 2006 
 2008 Arno Surminski
 2010  aka Lea Singer
 2012 
 2014 Herta Müller
 2016 Hanns-Josef Ortheil
 2018 Ulla Hahn
 2020 Klaus Modick
 2023 Juli Zeh

References

External links
  

German literary awards
Awards established in 2004
2004 establishments in Germany